Cajón is a district of the Pérez Zeledón canton, in the San José province of Costa Rica.

History 
Cajón was created on 3 March 1970 by Decreto Ejecutivo 14. Segregated from San Pedro.

Geography 
Cajón has an area of  km² and an elevation of  metres.

Demographics 

For the 2011 census, Cajón had a population of  inhabitants.

Transportation

Road transportation 
The district is covered by the following road routes:
 National Route 2
 National Route 322
 National Route 326

References 

Districts of San José Province
Populated places in San José Province